An annular solar eclipse occurred at the Moon's descending node of the orbit on September 22, 2006. A solar eclipse occurs when the Moon passes between Earth and the Sun, thereby totally or partly obscuring the image of the Sun for a viewer on Earth. An annular solar eclipse occurs when the Moon's apparent diameter is smaller than the Sun's, blocking most of the Sun's light and causing the Sun to look like an annulus (ring). An annular eclipse appears as a partial eclipse over a region of the Earth thousands of kilometres wide. The path of annularity of this eclipse passed through Guyana, Suriname, French Guiana, the northern tip of Roraima and Amapá of Brazil, and the southern Atlantic.

Images 
Animated path

Related eclipses

Eclipses of 2006 
 A penumbral lunar eclipse on March 14.
 A total solar eclipse on March 29.
 A partial lunar eclipse on September 7.
 An annular solar eclipse on September 22.

Tzolkinex 
 Preceded: Solar eclipse of August 11, 1999

 Followed: Solar eclipse of November 3, 2013

Half-Saros 
 Preceded: Lunar eclipse of September 16, 1997

 Followed: Lunar eclipse of September 28, 2015

Tritos 
 Preceded: Solar eclipse of October 24, 1995

 Followed: Solar eclipse of August 21, 2017

Solar Saros 144 
 Preceded: Solar eclipse of September 11, 1988

 Followed: Solar eclipse of October 2, 2024

Solar eclipses 2004–2007

Saros 144 

It is a part of Saros cycle 144, repeating every 18 years, 11 days, containing 70 events. The series started with partial solar eclipse on April 11, 1736. It contains annular eclipses from July 7, 1880 through August 27, 2565. There are no total eclipses in the series. The series ends at member 70 as a partial eclipse on May 5, 2980. The longest duration of annularity will be 9 minutes, 52 seconds on December 29, 2168.
<noinclude>

Inex series

Metonic series

Eclipse season 

This is the second eclipse this season, the first being the 7 September 2006 Partial Lunar Eclipse.

References

External links

Photos:
 Spaceweather.com eclipse gallery
 Photos of solar eclipse around the world

2006 9 22
2006 in science
2006 09 22
September 2006 events